Geary County USD 475 is a public unified school district headquartered in Junction City, Kansas, United States.  The district includes the communities of Grandview Plaza, Junction City, Milford, Fort Riley, fraction of northeast Ogden, and nearby rural areas.

Schools
The school district operates 1 high school, 2 middle schools, 13 elementary schools:

Junction City:
 Junction City High School
 Junction City Middle School
 Eisenhower Elementary School
 Franklin Elementary School
 Lincoln Elementary School
 Sheridan Elementary School
 Spring Valley Elementary School
 Washington Elementary School
 Westwood Elementary School
 H.D. Karns Building

Fort Riley:
 Fort Riley Middle School
 Fort Riley Elementary School
 Morris Hill Elementary School
 Seitz Elementary School
 Ware Elementary School

Grandview Plaza:
 Grandview Elementary School

Milford:
 Milford Elementary School

Other:
 Early Childhood Center

See also
 Kansas State Department of Education
 Kansas State High School Activities Association
 List of high schools in Kansas
 List of unified school districts in Kansas

References

External links
 

School districts in Kansas